Lulla Einrid Fossland (13 August 1917 – 3 December 2009) is a Norwegian politician for the Labour Party.

She was born in Harstad

She served as a deputy representative to the Norwegian Parliament from Rogaland during the terms 1969–1973 and 1973–1977. From November 1969 to 1973 she served as a regular representative, filling in for Peder P. Næsheim who had died.

On the local level she was a member of Karmøy municipal council from 1967 to 1971.

References

1917 births
2009 deaths
Members of the Storting
Labour Party (Norway) politicians
Rogaland politicians
Women members of the Storting
20th-century Norwegian women politicians
20th-century Norwegian politicians
People from Harstad